Sevici is a community bicycle program in Seville inaugurated in April 2007, modeled after the Vélo'v service in Lyon and Vélib' in Paris. Its purpose is to cover the small and medium daily routes within the city in a climate friendly way, almost without pollution (specially the emission of finest particulate matter), roadway noise, traffic congestion and to reclaim the urban streets with non-polluting vehicles.

Operation
The Ayuntamiento de Sevilla (Municipal Government) and JCDecaux manage and maintain the system. Two membership options are available; a weekly pass, purchasable at each of the station kiosks by credit card at a cost of 13.33 euros, and a yearly pass, requiring an application to be sent to the municipal government at a cost of 33.33 euros . Before the end of 2008 more than 250 stations and 2500 bikes will be available. The stations are situated throughout the inner-city with a distance of around 200 metres between each one, with many situated next to public transport stops to allow for intermodal use. The bikes can be borrowed from, and returned to, any station in the system, making it suitable for one way travel. Each station has between 10 and 40 parking slots to fix and lock the bicycle.

To borrow a bike with a yearly pass, one simply swipes the contactless RFID-card at a station kiosk to be personally identified by the system, which then unlocks a bike from the support frame. With a weekly pass, a ticket is printed with an ID number that can be punched in at the station kiosks to identify the user account.  Bicycles can be used for the first 30 minutes for free; the next 30 minutes are 1.03 euro. Subsequent hours are 2.04 euros. Hourly rates are discounted for the yearly pass. To return a bicycle one simply places the bike in a spare slot at a station, the bike is recognized automatically and is locked into place.

Subscription
The yearly subscription costing 33.33 euros requires an address where the pass is sent, whereas the weekly alternative (13.33 euros) can be obtained directly at any station by presenting a credit card. In both cases a 150 euro deposit is authorized in order to deter theft. (If a debit card is used, the 150 euros will be taken immediately and returned at the end of the hire period.)

When a weekly membership is purchased the user is provided with a member code ticket to be used at the stations rather than an RFID card, making the service immediately available to tourists.

See also

Community bicycle program

References

External links
sevici.es Spanish only
en.sevici.es  English
Seville Bikes iOS app with real time bike availability
Video analysis of the bicycle in Spanish

Community bicycle programs
Transport in Seville
Bicycle sharing in Spain